Vanu may refer to:

People
 Nigel Vanu (born 1989), Singaporean football player
 Vanu Bose (1965–2017), American electrical engineer and technology executive
 Vanu Gopala Menon (born 1960), Singaporean politician

Places
 Vanu, Iran

Other
 Vanu Sovereignty, a faction in the PlanetSide video game series
 Vojvodina Academy of Sciences and Arts